Martti Herman Peltonen (31 August 1901, Orivesi - 3 October 1973) was a Finnish mechanic and politician. He was imprisoned in 1918 for having sided with the Reds during the Finnish Civil War. He was a member of the Parliament of Finland from 1939 to 1945, representing the Social Democratic Party of Finland (SDP).

References

1901 births
1973 deaths
People from Orivesi
People from Häme Province (Grand Duchy of Finland)
Social Democratic Party of Finland politicians
Members of the Parliament of Finland (1939–45)
People of the Finnish Civil War (Red side)
Prisoners and detainees of Finland
Finnish people of World War II